(born June 25, 1965) is a Japanese animator, storyboard writer, and director. He has directed many anime series, including Fancy Lala, Koi Kaze, Gakuen Alice, Hell Girl, Natsume's Book of Friends, Baccano!, Durarara!! and Samurai Flamenco.

Filmography 
1988
 Metal Skin Panic MADOX-01: Key Animation
1996
 Baby and Me: Director, Storyboard

1997
 Hyper Police: Director

1998
 Fancy Lala: Series Director, Storyboard, Episode Director
 Yoiko: Director

1999
 Power Stone: Director, Storyboard

2002
 Haibane Renmei: Storyboard, Episode Director

2003
 Wonder Bevil: Director

2004
 Koi Kaze: Director
 Gakuen Alice: Director, Storyboard, Script

2005
 Hell Girl: Director, Dubbing Director

2006
 Hell Girl: Two Mirrors: Director, Dubbing Director

2007
 Baccano!: Director, Storyboard, Episode Director

2008
 Natsume's Book of Friends: Director

2009
 Natsume's Book of Friends Two: Director

2010
 Durarara!!: Director
 Princess Jellyfish : Director

2011
 Hotarubi no Mori e: Director
 Natsume's Book of Friends Three: Director

2012
 Natsume's Book of Friends Four: Director

2013
 Samurai Flamenco: Director

2015
 Durarara!!×2: Director

2016
 Natsume's Book of Friends Five: Chief Director

2017
 Natsume's Book of Friends Six: Chief Director
 Hell Girl: The Fourth Twilight: Director

2018
 Natsume's Book of Friends the Movie: Ephemeral Bond: Chief Director

2020
 Pet: Director

2021
Natsume's Book of Friends: The Waking Rock and the Strange Visitor: Chief Director
Eiga Sumikko Gurashi: Aoi Tsukiyo no Mahō no Ko

References

External links 
 

Anime directors
Japanese animators
Japanese animated film directors
Japanese television directors
Japanese voice directors
Living people
1965 births
People from Tokyo